A bloodless war is generally a small conflict, crisis, or dispute between rival groups that is resolved without human death or injury, although the threat of violence usually seems very likely at the time. Intentional property damage, however, may still occur. Typically, these events are recorded in history as wars even though the term "war" generally implies violence. Therefore, the term "bloodless war" is somewhat of an oxymoron. Nevertheless, there have been many conflicts throughout history labeled as such.

Bloodless wars 
The following is a list of bloodless wars:

Incorrectly categorized wars 
The following wars are often labelled incorrectly as bloodless wars: 
 Cold War: unknown number of killed
 Cod Wars: one man killed, one man wounded
 Toledo War: one man wounded
 Battle of Athens (1946): several wounded
 Conquest of New Netherland: three killed
 Invasion of the Gambia: initial invasion was bloodless, first casualties were reported during the occupation and stabilization period

See also 
 Non-violent revolution
 Frozen conflict
 Cod Wars

References

Notes

Sources 
 
 
 
 

Wars by type